The Red Dragon Centre is an indoor entertainment complex in southern Cardiff, the capital of Wales. It was originally known as the Atlantic Wharf Leisure Village when it opened in August 1997. The complex features restaurants, cafés, a Hollywood Bowl bowling alley with arcade amusements, an Odeon multiplex cinema, a casino and an on-site car park. 

It is located in the Cardiff Bay area, opposite the Wales Millennium Centre. This is close to the A4232 and near Cardiff Bay railway station. It is directly served by Cardiff Bus routes 6 (Baycar) and 8 (via Grangetown, Central Station) to the city centre.

History

The centre opened in 1997 as the Atlantic Wharf Leisure Village. The centre was renamed in 2000 as Red Dragon Centre (named after the commercial radio station for Cardiff and Newport, Red Dragon FM) Red Dragon FM has since been rebranded as Capital South Wales. The station is based in the centre, alongside Heart South Wales.

The multiplex cinema was originally managed by United Cinemas International (UCI). However, in 2004 Odeon and UCI were bought by private equity firm, Terra Firma, and the two companies were merged under the Odeon name.

In 2020, the British Airways Pension Fund sold the Red Dragon Centre to Cardiff Council for a reported £60m.

Future plans
In November 2018, it was reported that a 15,000-seat indoor arena would be built on the site. The Atlantic Wharf site was chosen over six other sites, including Callaghan Square near Cardiff Central railway station, the 5,000-seat Motorpoint Arena Cardiff, with an arena suggested as part of a £150m redevelopment of Cardiff Arms Park.

The current Red Dragon Centre could be demolished and replaced by a new leisure complex, or receive a partial redevelopment on the existing site. If demolished, tenants would migrate over to the new property while the remaining parts of the project are built. A planning application was expected to be submitted in July 2019. On 17 December 2019, it was announced that Cardiff Council's cabinet had been granted permission for the local authority to purchase the Red Dragon Centre from the British Airways Pension Fund (BAPF) for an undisclosed sum. An element of the purchase price will only be payable to the pension fund when a planning application is submitted for the new Arena project on any part of the Atlantic Wharf site (the combined County Hall and Red Dragon Centre site) within a 10 year period.

The council aims to appoint a development partner and operator for the new arena by April 2020 and aim for a detailed planning application to be submitted by the selected developer before September 2020. Construction work is projected to begin in May 2021 and the arena could be opened in June 2023. The new arena will be based on the Ziggo Dome in Amsterdam.

Live Nation UK, the operator of the city's Motorpoint Arena, has approached the council with a view to operating the new venue if it is built. On 27 November 2020, Live Nation and builders Robertson Group were announced as the winning bidders to operate and construct the venue. Entertainment investors Oak View Group are also part of the consortium. Further plans, that could form part of a £500m regeneration scheme, include waterfront apartments, bars and restaurants, a cinema complex and a hotel.

Centre tenants

Current tenants include: 
Grosvenor Casinos
Bella Italia
Cadwaladers Coffee House
Hollywood Bowl
Five Guys
Odeon
Capital South Wales
Heart South Wales
Travelodge

See also
List of cultural venues in Cardiff
List of places in Cardiff

References

External links

Economy of Cardiff
Tourist attractions in Cardiff
Culture in Cardiff
Buildings and structures in Cardiff
Entertainment venues in Wales
Buildings and structures completed in 1997
1997 establishments in Wales